The Yokosuka H5Y (short designation) or Yokosuka Navy Type 99 Flying Boat Model 11 (九九式飛行艇, 99shiki hikōtei) (long designation), given the allied code name Cherry, was an IJNAS flying boat in service from 1938.

Design and development
The H5Y was designed by Yokosuka to meet an IJNAS requirement for a twin-engine maritime reconnaissance flying boat, which was intended to match the performance of contemporary four-engine flying boats, while being cheaper to build and easier to maintain. Two prototypes were built at the 11th Naval Arsenal, Hiro, being completed in 1936.

The H5Y was a twin-engine parasol wing aircraft, and thus resembled a scaled-down version of the Kawanishi H6K "Mavis". Performance was found to be poor however, with the aircraft underpowered and suffering from structural problems which delayed production. Only 20 were built between 1936 and 1941. Yokosuka Naval Air Arsenal built the aircraft at the Dai-Juichi Kaigun Kokusho facility.

Operational history
The H5Y was accepted for production in 1938 as the Type 99 Flying Boat Model 11, production deliveries starting in 1939. However, production was quickly cancelled owing to the poor performance, only 20 being built. Although some were used for coastal anti-submarine patrols early in World War II, they were quickly transferred to second line duties such as transport or training.

Variants
H5Y
2 Prototypes constructed at the Hiro Naval Arsenal
H5Y1
Production model, 18 built.
Yokosuka Navy Type 99 Flying Boat Model 11
The long formal designation of the H5Y.

Operators

 Imperial Japanese Navy Air Service

Specifications (Yokosuka H5Y1)

See also

References
Notes

Bibliography

External links

 www.combinedfleet.com 
 www.fsdome.com 
 

H5Y
H5Y, Yokosuka
Flying boats
Parasol-wing aircraft
Aircraft first flown in 1936
Twin piston-engined tractor aircraft